Mitsuo (written: , , , , , , , , ,  or  in hiragana) is a masculine Japanese given name. Notable people with the name include:

Mitsuo Aoki (1914–2010), American theologian
, Japanese naval aviator
Mitsuo Fujikura, Japanese mixed martial artist
, Japanese anime director
Mitsuo Harada (born 1964), Japanese golfer
, Japanese anime director
, Japanese manga artist
, Japanese cross-country skier
, Japanese politician
, Japanese sport wrestler
, Japanese animator and anime director
, Japanese motorcycle racer
, Japanese voice actor
, Japanese archaeologist and academic
, Japanese footballer and manager
, Japanese footballer
, Japanese activist
, Japanese politician
, Japanese professional wrestler
, pen-name of Koba Ichiro, Japanese writer
, Japanese sprint canoeist
, Japanese footballer
, Japanese sport shooter
, Japanese voice actor
, Japanese art, film and music director
, Japanese physicist
, Japanese baseball player
, Tsunku (:ja:つんく♂)'s real name, a prolific Japanese record producer, songwriter, and vocalist
, Japanese artistic gymnast
, Japanese footballer
, Japanese footballer
, Japanese sport shooter
, Japanese screenwriter and film director
, Japanese baseball player

Japanese masculine given names